Hamilton (HMN) is a former railroad station on Amtrak's Cardinal route between Chicago and New York City.  The station in Hamilton, Ohio, was served by the Cardinal from August 1980 until October 31, 2005, when it was discontinued as a stop.  Constructed by the Cincinnati, Hamilton & Dayton Railroad (later acquired by the Baltimore & Ohio Railroad), the building is still owned by CSX though currently unused. It sits at the junction of the Indianapolis Subdivision with the Toledo Subdivision both part of the CSX Louisville Division, and headed south of the station the line is known as the Cincinnati Terminal Subdivision, also due to a directional running agreement most CSX and Norfolk Southern freight trains will use the Cincinnati Terminal Subdivision headed north to New River Junction in New Miami, Ohio where Norfolk Southern trains diverge to the left on the New Castle District, and CSX trains diverge to the right on the Toledo Subdivision. Now headed south towards Cincinnati most CSX and Norfolk Southern trains will diverge at the Butler St. Interlocker just blocks before the station heading south on the New Castle District. The Pennsylvania Railroad, followed by the Penn Central, used another station on Maple Avenue until 1971.

Passenger service

Historical service
The station was a stop for all the Baltimore and Ohio trains from Cincinnati to Detroit via Dayton and Toledo. In 1965, these included the Cincinnatian and the Night Express. In the final years of B&O passenger train service between Cincinnati and Detroit, the Cincinnatian was the last of these trains bound directly north. Amtrak opted not to continue the service north of Hamilton to Dayton and Detroit.

Recent years
The station was a stop for Amtrak's Cardinal from 1980 until October 31, 2005. It was not a heavily patronized stop in recent years, and only had a waiting room. Ticketing and baggage service were not available at this location. The Cardinal originally stopped at Hamilton regularly, but poor station conditions, low ridership, and inconvenient arrival/departure times caused Amtrak to convert it into a flag stop in November 2004 and discontinue the stop altogether a year later, although the train still passes by the station without stopping.

City officials, as of February 2021, have called for Hamilton to be added as a stop in Cincinnati–Chicago passenger trains.

Demolition
In 2020, the city of Hamilton was trying to develop a plan to prevent a planned demolition of the station by its owner CSX as part of a track modernization plan. The city is considering purchasing the building and moving it several blocks to Third Street and Sycamore Street. After restoration, they hope to utilize the building as a transportation hub, museum, restaurant, or a farmers' market.

Steam excursions

The last steam locomotive operated through Hamilton guiding a Baltimore & Ohio freight train in May 1958. A year later, in May 1959, two retired steam locomotives stored at South Hamilton Yard were sent to Cincinnati to be scrapped.

Steam excursions have stopped at the station with Nickel Plate 765, in 1984, as a Cincinnati 1984 National Railway Historical Society National Convention excursions, on August 25, 1984, from Cincinnati to Muncie, Indiana, which would take the Cincinnati Terminal Subdivision to Hamilton than take the New Castle District at New River Junction in New Miami, Ohio. The next day on August 26, on a trip from Cincinnati to Indianapolis over the Indianapolis Subdivision west from Hamilton, Ohio after coming up the CSX Cincinnati Terminal Subdivision again. The engine would pass by again September 4, on a one way ferry move hauling freight taking the same route as the trip to Muncie, this time headed from Ludlow, Kentucky, back home to Ft. Wayne, Indiana.

Would also pass thru September 9, 1982, hauling freight on a one way ferry move from Lima, Ohio, to Cincinnati on the CSX Toledo Subdivision for weekend excursions after coming from its homebase in Ft. Wayne. These excursions on September 11–12, 1982, from Cincinnati to Muncie ran on the Norfolk Southern New Castle District. Would pass thru yet again on another one way ferry move on October 27, 1986, from Cincinnati back home to Ft. Wayne on the way back from pulling the New River Train in West Virginia taking the CSX Cincinnati Terminal Subdivision, rather than the Norfolk Southern New Castle District at New River Junction in New Miami, Ohio.

On October 15, 1990, it would pass thru on a one way ferry move hauling freight again headed from Lima to Cincinnati while on its way to West Virginia to pull the New River Train again, than headed back thru on October 29. A steam excursion as Chesapeake & Ohio 2765 on a trip sponsored by the Cincinnati Railroad Club on October 3, 1993, on another trip from Cincinnati to Indianapolis and return over the CSX Indianapolis Subdivision.

The Chessie Safety Express with Chesapeake & Ohio 614 would pass thru May 9, 1981, on a round trip from Cincinnati to Lima, and return on the Chessie System Toledo Subdivision. The American Freedom Train would pass thru with Reading 2101 on June 12, 1975, headed from Cincinnati to Archbold, Ohio, on the Chessie System Toledo Subdivision heading north. On August 3, 1991, Nickel Plate 765 & Pere Marquette 1225 would both together pass thru as a doubleheader deadhead move from Lima south down the CSX Toledo Subdivision to Cincinnati, while heading to the 1991 National Railway Historical Society National Convention in Huntington, West Virginia.

New Hamilton station
By 2022, the city was studying the feasibility of building a new stop for the Cardinal northwest of the old station on the CSX tracks in Symmes Park.

References

External links
Hamilton Amtrak Station (USA Rail Guide -- Train Web)
 Railroads of Cincinnati, includes rail information and history of Hamilton

Former railway stations in Ohio
Buildings and structures in Hamilton, Ohio
Former Baltimore and Ohio Railroad stations
Railway stations in the United States opened in 1980
Railway stations closed in 2005
Transportation buildings and structures in Butler County, Ohio
2005 disestablishments in Ohio
Former Amtrak stations in Ohio